HD 84810, also known as l Carinae (l Car), is a star in the southern constellation of Carina. Its apparent magnitude varies from about 3.4 to 4.1, making it readily visible to the naked eye and one of the brightest members of Carina.

From the characteristics of its spectrum, l Carinae has a stellar classification of G5 Iab/Ib. This indicates the star has reached a stage in its evolution where it has expanded to become a supergiant with 169 times the radius of the Sun.

l Carinae is classified as a Cepheid variable star and its brightness varies over an amplitude range of 0.725 in magnitude with a long period of 35.560 days. This unusually long period makes it essential for calibrating the period-luminosity relation for Cepheid variables; additionally, it is one of the nearest Cepheid variables, making it relatively easy to observe. The radial velocity of the star likewise varies by 39 km/s during each pulsation cycle.

It has a compact circumstellar envelope that can be discerned using interferometry. The envelope has been resolved at an infrared wavelength of 10μm, showing a radius of 10–100 AU at a mean temperature of 100 K. The material for this envelope was supplied by mass ejected from the central star.

The period of l Carinae is calculated to be slowly increasing and it is thought to be crossing the instability strip for the third time, cooling as it evolves towards a red supergiant after a blue loop.

References 

Carinae, l
Carina (constellation)
Classical Cepheid variables
084810
G-type supergiants
3884
047854
Durchmusterung objects
F-type supergiants
K-type supergiants